Kelly Key is the debut album by Brazilian recording pop artist Kelly Key, released on December 22, 2001 by Warner Music. The album brought ten fully copyright tracks, composed by Kelly in partnership with Andinho, Gustavo Lins and Rubens de Paula, plus a remix of "Escondido" as a bonus track. The tracks were produced by DJ Cuca and Sergio Mama, bringing the artistic production was created by Tom Capone and amixagem the Afegan producer directly from the recording studios in New York City. Kelly Key brought a differential to join R&B and dance-pop to the mode used by international artists, a novelty in Brazil at that time, with the biggest inspirations the American singers Britney Spears, Jennifer Lopez, Christina Aguilera, Madonna and Janet Jackson, beyond Brazil Luciana Mello and Fernanda Abreu. The album reached the top spot on the music charts in Brazil, selling a total of 1,000,000 copies and winning the platinum certificate.

The album received mostly positive reviews. Alex Antunes, Portal Dedo do Meio, said the work could address gender and feminism without using profanity and sounding more natural and less "virgin" that other Brazilian artists of pop romantic music, which meant that there was a greater identification of young people with his drive. The portal Contém Pop said the drive was well structured and significantly contributed to the construction and history of Brazilian music. Naiady Piva, the Portal Pop, compared to disk ...Baby One More Time Britney Spears work. Carlos Eduardo Lima, the Scream & Yell magazine, said the album broke the "prefabricated good-looking hypocritical" in Brazilian music, portraying young people as something enclosed, being the opposite of double Sandy & Junior.

The first single released was "Escondido", on June 18, 2001, but it was the same with "Baba", his second work of music on November 7, 
that success started happening and Kelly began to appear among the top positions on the radio for weeks and came to have an agenda of Monday appointments to the second, including programs, photo shoots and interviews due to the sudden success.

Development and production
In October 1999 Kelly met Dalmo Beloti, entrepreneur and artistic director of Sony Music Brazil, who invited her to record a demo disk for your project. Bellotti was looking for a girl between 16 and 20 years and rigorously fair-haired to launch as a singer in a format similar to the design work of the US Britney Spears, combining pop and R&B music with choreography marked. At the time Kelly thinks of decline the invitation because it had no intention to work with music, targeting only follow as host, however, encouraged by his parents, eventually accepted the proposal. In early 2000 she recorded a demo with Cuca music producer, and after being approved by Bellotti, was sent to some record labels, gaining interest from Warner and closing it with the partnership to release five albums over the next few years. After signing the contract, Kelly began working with the musician in Andinho own compositions, as their demand was that his album would be completely copyright, bringing only letters which she wrote. With Andinho producer, Kelly divided the composition of "Escondido", "Anjo", "Quem é Você" "Viajar no Groove" and "Cachorrinho", as well as "Bolada", which also brought Gustavo Lins work.  Two other tracks, "Brincar de Amar" and "Tudo Com Você" were worked by the singer along with Rubinho Paula and DJ Cuca.
 
At the end of the composition phase Kelly showed Andinho a band made up for it at 13, entitled "Baba", which talked about his teacher who had the despised. 
Although initially not believe that would be good enough for the job, they and Andinho worked in the band, incorporating new verses and creating an endpoint to include it on the album. 
After finishing the step of creating the tracks, Kelly recorded the vocals and the tracks were sent to the studio Warner in New York City, where they were produced by Cuca in partnership with Sergio Mama. The concept of work and artistic production was created by Tom Capone, who also supervised the overall production. 
To take care of mixing the album, Kelly also invited the producer Afegan. In parallel, its artistic features have also become polished, through taking singing and dancing lessons, where he began to create the dance moves of your music with Dudu Neves choreographer.

A visual identity was also created, which, according to the journalist Carlos Eduardo Lima, not fit for an international standard of "false blonde girl's face and body fitness". In search of a stage name that sounded authentic and strong, chose Kelly Key, Chico Audi photographer suggestion while conducting his first photo essay, arguing that symbolize the key to success.

Music and lyrics

Musical styles and themes
In terms of musical composition, Kelly Key is considered a notable departure from previous work of Brazilian pop singers in the 1990s and early 2000s. In contrast to the singers of the era, which focused on the romantic melodies and compositions based on the woman depends primarily on man, Kelly led a women's movement themed geared to women. Technically the Kelly Key songs follow the musical style pop and R&B with influences from other genres such as dance-pop, bubblegum pop and hip hop inspired essentially in American music. Lyrically the album use as main themes female sexuality, feminism, empowerment of women and love relationships in the view of strong female figure and independent, having a true connection to the public by embedded realism tracks sung in explicit form.

"Escondido" is the view of a woman on the opening of female sexuality, told by a teenager who runs away from home to go to the motel sex with the boyfriend hidden from parents. During the band Kelly confronts his father about having an active sex life: "(Meu pai quer me proibir / E qual é coroa, vai me dizer que o senhor nunca... hã? / Eu não sou criança, não / Eu cresci, eu cresci)". On the track "Baba" revenge movie the story of the girl who was snubbed by an older man when preteen and, after reaching the age of 17 with a sculptural body, begins to snub the advances of it, causing it just out of spite and showing the feminine power. "Bolada" talks about the girl who slept with the guy and he disappeared shortly after. the track "Anjo" tells of a love relationship based on a passion.

Feminism takes lighter shades in "Só Quero Ficar", where the main character wants to enjoy life with several boys without compromise she has the power to choose, closing the song with a rap where he talks about the possibilities of women develop without a man  ("Eu vou trabalhar / Me dedicar aos estudos / Me estabilizar / Ter meu lugar no mundo / Ser independente financeiramente / Pra não ter que bater na porta de parentes / Eu não quero depender de ninguém"). In "Brincar de Amor" and "Quem é Você?" is the central theme of betrayal, but on different views. At first the main character planning a revenge on the guy that cheats, although miss, strengthening the feeling that a woman should not accept being cheated. in the second there is a suffering for the discovery of betrayal, telling the partner seemed to be someone totally different from what was thought to know. "Tudo Com Você" is about the partner's jealousy at a party, as the central character is dancing with several guys. 
Finally "Viajar no Groove" speaks freely about enjoy the evening in a ballad.

Track listing

Charts

Year-end charts

Certifications

Release history

References

2001 debut albums
Kelly Key albums